Wakinoichthys is a small freshwater fish from the Early Cretaceous of South Korea and Japan. Two species are currently known: W. aokii and W. robustus.

History and naming
The first specimens of Wakinoichthys have been discovered in the Wakino Subgroup, a part of the Kanmon Group from Kitakyushu in 1994.  Starting in 1977 Japanese and Korean researchers have cooperated in excavating fossils from the from Gyeongsang Supergroup, previously known to have yielded the fossils of plants and molluscs. In these collaborative efforts multiple fossil fish had been discovered, including a specimen of Wakinoichthys.

The generic name derives from the Wakino Formation and ichthys, the Greek word for fish. W. aokii was named for Mr. Tateyu Aoki, who collected and donated the specimens to the Kitakyushu Museum and Institute of Natural History, while W. robustus was named for its more robust build compared to its relative.

Description
The median fins are positioned relatively posterior and the dorsal fin's origin lies behind that of the anal fin. The base of the dorsal fin is about half the length of the anal fin's base. The pectoral fins are elongated with a stout first pectoral fin ray. The pelvic fin is located at the centre of the abdoman and the caudal fin is forked. Wakinoichthys had long lower jaws that housed small canine-like teeth, while those of the upper jaw were larger and more pronounced. The endopterygoid meanwhile housed villiform teeth.

W. robustus differs from W. aokii due to its more robust build. Its total body length is only 3.8 times longer than its body depth and with a proportionally bigger head. The dorsal outline of the skull is slightly convex.

Phylogeny
Yabumoto assigns Wakinoichthys to the order of the Osteoglossiformes, which includes the modern arowana, butterflyfish, elephantfish and knifefish based on a series of characters such as the position of the median fins, dentition of the premaxilla and dentary and villiform endopterygoid teeth among other morphological traits.

References

Prehistoric ray-finned fish genera
Fossil taxa described in 1994
Fossils of Japan
Fossils of South Korea
Osteoglossiformes